Kyrgyzstan participated in the Turkvision Song Contest 2014 in Kazan, Tatarstan, Russia. The song "Seze bil" performed by Non-Stop was selected as the Kyrgyzstani entry for the contest in a national final.

Background

Kyrgyzstan had previously participated in the inaugural  contest. Çoro represented Kyrgyzstan with the song "Tooluk kız" in Eskişehir, Turkey, placing eighth in the final.

Before Turkvision

National final 
Kyrgyzstani broadcaster KTRK organised a national final to select their entry for the contest, which consisted of a non-televised semi-final and a televised final on 26 October 2014.

Semi-final
The semi-final jury consisted of five members:
Raykhan Beyshenaliyeva – Composer
Gul'zinat Suranchiyeva – Singer
Erkin Meyerkanov – Composer
Zamira Moldosheva – Designer
Gul'nur Satylganova – People's Artist of the Kyrgyz Republic

Final
The final was held at 20:00 KGT (15:00 CET) on 26 October 2014 at the Kyrgyz State Philharmonic Society. Ten artists competed in the selection.

Artist and song information

Non-Stop
Non-Stop was a Kyrgyzstani duo formed in 2011, consisting of members Maksat Sadırbekov and Colpon Talıpbek. The duo disbanded in 2018.

Discography

Seze bil
"Seze bil" is a song by Kyrgyzstani duo Non-Stop, composed by Nazgul Toktokunova, Aman Berdzhibaev and Atkar Berdzhibaev, and with lyrics by Kyalbek Kyrgyz.

At Turkvision

Semi-final
Kyrgyzstan performed thirteenth in the semi-final on 19 November 2014, placing sixth in a field of 25 countries with 190 points, thus qualifying for the final.

Final
Kyrgyzstan performed seventh in the final on 21 November 2014, placing fourth in a field of 15 countries with 196 points.

Voting
The results were determined solely by jury voting. Each country was represented by one juror who gave each song, with the exception of their own country's song, between 1 and 10 points. The Kyrgyzstani juror was Gulnur Satylganova.

Points awarded to Kyrgyzstan

Points awarded by Kyrgyzstan

References

Countries in the Turkvision Song Contest 2014
2014
Turkvision